Bellaspira barbadensis is a species of sea snail, a marine gastropod mollusc in the family Drilliidae.

Description
The size of an adult shell varies between 6 mm and 15 mm.

Distribution
This species occurs in the Caribbean Sea off Barbados, the Netherlands Antilles and Venezuela

References

 Fallon P.J. (2016). Taxonomic review of tropical western Atlantic shallow water Drilliidae (Mollusca: Gastropoda: Conoidea) including descriptions of 100 new species. Zootaxa. 4090(1): 1–363

External links
 

barbadensis
Gastropods described in 2016